Castleward Forest is a woodland located beside Castle Ward near Strangford, Northern Ireland. It consists of coniferous and deciduous trees. The forest is managed by the National Trust.

References

Forests and woodlands of Northern Ireland